FEX may refer to:

 Fabric extenders, in Cisco Nexus switches#Nexus 2000 series
 Fexofenadine
 Foreign Extemporaneous Speaking